Nestorian relates to Nestorianism, a Christological doctrine developed by Nestorius, leading to the Nestorian controversy and Nestorian Schism; it was condemned as heresy by the Council of Ephesus in 431.

"Nestorian" or "Nestorians" may also refer to:
Church of the East, originally the church in the Sassanid Empire, which once accepted the Nestorian doctrine and split off from orthodoxy at the Nestorian Schism
Assyrian Church of the East
Ancient Church of the East
"Nestorian" script or East Syriac Maḏnḥāyā, a form of the Syriac alphabet
"Nestorian" Stele in China

See also

The Nestorian controversy, part of the Christological controversies of the 4th and 5th centuries
Church of the East (disambiguation), any of several Churches that historically go back to the original Church of the East but developed doctrinal differences